Tahsin Muhammed Salim Taha (Kurdish:تەحسین محەممەد سليم تەھا) (25 May 1941 - 28 May 1995). was a Kurdish singer. Taha was born in Amadiya District in Iraqi Kurdistan.Tahsin Taha finished his school in the city of Amadiya and moved to Baghdad for higher education. Taha graduated from the Institute of Fine Arts in Baghdad in 1964. Taha registered his first song in 1958. He emigrated to Netherlands in 1994 and died there in 1995.

References

1941 births
1995 deaths
Kurdish male singers
People from Amadiya
20th-century Iraqi male singers